Ossian Donner (24 March 1866 – 2 August 1957) was a Finnish industrialist, engineer and diplomat.

Biography

Donner founded the wool mill in Hyvinkää and served as CEO of the United Wool Factory until 1918.

He built a house on Mauritzgatan 6 in Kruununhaka in Helsinki for his wife and two children in 1901. Since the early 1930s it is the seat of Svenska Klubben.

During the civil war in Finland, his Scottish wife, Violet McHutchen, saw Russian officers being executed in a park the near their home. Shocking war experiences forced the family to move to London, where Ossian Donner became the Finland's Representative and later became Chargé d'affaires to the United Kingdom in 1919.

During the Åland Islands dispute, he was also Finland's Special Envoy at the League of Nations.

He held a speech against the Soviet Union which ended his diplomatic career.

He was released from Finland as Envoy to London in 1925. After that, he settled permanently in England and gained British citizenship.

Ossian Donner belonged to the Donner family. He was the son of Professor Otto Donner, grandson of Anders Donner and brother of the linguist and right-wing activist Kai Donner. The British  Conservative MP  Patrick Donner was Ossian's son.

Donner is buried at the St Andrew's Church cemetery in Hurstbourne Priors Civil Parish in Basingstoke and Deane Borough in Hampshire, England.

Donner Park is located in the center of Hyvinkää, where there is also a 14-meter Obelisk commemorating Donner's memorial, a commemoration of the wool industry and a fountain.

See also
Donner family

References 

Finnish diplomats
Donner family
Finnish people of German descent
1866 births
1957 deaths
Finnish emigrants to England
Naturalised citizens of the United Kingdom
20th-century Finnish engineers
Finnish business executives
19th-century Finnish businesspeople
20th-century Finnish businesspeople
Engineers from Helsinki